Regent College is an interdenominational evangelical Christian College of Christian studies, and an affiliated college of the University of British Columbia, located next to the university's campus in the University Endowment Lands west of Vancouver, British Columbia. The school's stated mission is to "cultivate intelligent, vigorous, and joyful commitment to Jesus Christ, His church, and His world."

About 500 students are enrolled in full- or part-time studies. In any given year, one-third to one-half of students are Canadian, another one-quarter to one-third are American, and the remaining twenty to thirty per cent come from around the globe.

History 

Regent was established in 1968 to provide graduate theological education to the laity, and only in 1979 started a program to train students who will become clergy. After the first summer school class, the graduate Diploma of Christian Studies began; within two years, enrollment grew from 4 to 44 students and the Master of Christian Studies was added. Affiliation with UBC followed in 1975, and accreditation by the Association of Theological Schools in 1985. The last comprehensive evaluation occurred in 2010.

The principals and presidents of the college have been James M. Houston (1970–1978), Carl Armerding (1978–1988), Walter Wright Jr. (1988–2000) and outgoing president Rod Wilson (2000–2015). Jeffrey P. Greenman began his term as the fifth president on February 1, 2015. Greenman is the first alumnus of Regent College to become president.

Regent initially rented rooms in various buildings at UBC, including St. Andrews Hall and Vancouver School of Theology, and occupied two fraternity houses on Wesbrook Mall for a time. In 1989, Regent moved into its own new building in the current location at the corner of Wesbrook & University, with the distinctive green roof. A subsequent capital campaign finished in 2006, adding the John Richard Allison Library and the Windtower to Regent College's architectural distinctiveness.

Academic programs 

Though Regent College is an affiliated school of the UBC, unlike other affiliated schools such as Vancouver School of Economy, the University does not offer any theological degree due to the University Act. The college does offer four main graduate programs, all ATS-accredited:
 Graduate Diploma in Christian Studies (DipCS)
 Master of Arts in Christian Studies (MACS)
 Master of Arts in Theological Studies (MATS)
 Master of Divinity (M.Div.)
 Master of Theology (Th.M.)
 Master of Arts in Leadership, Theology, and Society (MALTS)

Student life 

On Tuesdays during fall and winter term, the college community gathers for chapel, followed by optional community group meetings and a lunch of homemade soup and bread. The Regent College Student Association oversees a variety of student life activities and services, including Taste of the World, book sales, an annual Christmas Party, an annual retreat, the Regent Spouse's Network, and more.

Because Regent is a UBC affiliate school, Regent students qualify for the U-Pass and the AMS insurance plan, and may make use of other UBC services such as the library system, health centre, and the pool.

Alumni and faculty 

More than 4,500 students have graduated from Regent College and, due to the summer programs, over 30,000 students have taken classes. After Vancouver, Hong Kong hosts the second greatest number of Regent graduates, with other major pockets in Seattle, Calgary, Edmonton, Toronto, Singapore and London.

At present, Regent College employs 17 full-time faculty. Notable faculty emeriti include Eugene Peterson, Maxine Hancock, Loren Wilkinson, Gordon T. Smith, Paul Stevens, Gordon Fee, J.I. Packer and Bruce Waltke. Summer school classes are often taught by some notable Christian thinkers, including N.T. Wright, Andrew Walls, Luci Shaw, Richard Mouw, Alister McGrath, Malcolm Guite, George Marsden and Mark Noll.

Buildings and features 

The John Richard Allison Library is one of the major theological libraries in Western Canada. It houses the resources of Regent and Carey Theological College. Its catalogue is shared with Carey Theological College, Vancouver School of Theology, and St. Mark's College.

Regent College Bookstore is one of the premier theological bookstores in Western Canada. It frequently hosts public lectures and booksignings, and has its own publishing program.

The Lookout Gallery showcases seven annual exhibitions, including shows by Regent students in the Christianity and the Arts concentration.

The Chapel is the heart of worship and community building at Regent. The weekly Tuesday Chapel service at 11 am is widely attended by students, faculty, staff, and guests. The piano within is a Steinway grand.

True North Windtower features photovoltaic art glass by artist Sarah Hall, and it has been documented by the Institute for Stained Glass in Canada.

The Atrium & The Well, a coffee shop which grew out of one Regent student’s final Christianity & the Marketplace project. In 2011 the kitchen off the Atrium was re-dedicated as the Rita Houston Kitchen, to mark the powerful impact of Rita Houston on Regent’s community life over the years.

Media 

Regent College produces a wide variety of print and electronic media, including:

 Crux: A Quarterly Journal of Christian Thought and Opinion
 Regent World, a thrice-yearly newsletter
 EtCetera, a student newspaper published bi-weekly during the regular term. 
 EtCetera Podcast, a student podcast published bi-weekly in partnership with the EtCetera student newspaper. The EtCetera Podcast is hosted by the EtCetera Senior Editor.
 ReFrame, a 10-week film based small group curriculum 
 Regent Audio
 Regent Bookstore

In addition, Regent College Publishing specializes in re-publishing out-of-print Christian literature and features an increasing number of original titles. Notable recent projects include a parallel-prose edition of Milton's Paradise Lost and co-published works by Gordon Fee and Bruce Waltke.

See also 

 Vancouver School of Theology
 University Endowment Lands
 University of British Columbia
 List of evangelical seminaries and theological colleges

References

External links 

 

 
Evangelical seminaries and theological colleges in Canada
University Endowment Lands
University of British Columbia
Educational institutions established in 1968
Universities in British Columbia